A jackaroo is an Australian agricultural trainee. 

Jackaroo may also refer to:

Arts and entertainment
 Jackaroo (miniseries), a 1990 Australian miniseries
 Jackaroo, a 1985 novel by Cynthia Voigt
 Jackaroo, a character by Gary Chaloner in the comic book Cyclone!
 Jackaroo, an alien being in one of Paul J. McAuley's Jackaroo book series (2006–2016)

Transport
 Holden Jackaroo, an Australian market name for a Japanese  utility or wagon for rough ground 
 Thruxton Jackaroo, a 1950s British four-seat biplane

See also
 Buddy Williams (country musician), a singer-songwriter known as "the yodelling jackaroo"
 Cowboy (disambiguation)